Racek Kobyla of Dvorce (also Dvojic, Dvojitz, or Dwoygicz; died 2 February 1416) was a Bohemian landowner, hetman of Wenceslaus IV of Bohemia, and burgrave of Vyšehrad during the Late Middle Ages.

Biography
Not much is known about Racek's early life. He is first mentioned in 1403 as being the overseer of silver mining in the settlement of Stříbrná Skalice. In that year, the town was razed by Sigismund of Luxembourg. Racek evacuated the town and initially retreated to Talmberk. Reportedly, only an elderly woman and a pig were left in Skalice. Fleeing the continuing threat of Sigismund, Racek continued to Rataje nad Sázavou where he was received by Hanuš of Lipá.

In the service of King Wenceslaus, Racek helped wage a guerilla campaign against the Rosenberg family. He acted with other men such as Jan Žižka, Jan Sokol of Lamberk, and Matthew the Leader. In 1410, he was appointed burgrave of Vyšehrad by Wenceslas. In 1412, he was permitted to build his castle, Veselé, near present-day Chocerady. In 1415, Racek was mentioned as a patron of the Chocerady church.

In 1416, Racek was sent to Kutná Hora to collect taxes for the king. He was a known follower of the teachings of Jan Hus, who was proclaimed a heretic. On 2 February, Racek and 12 of his associates were murdered in a tavern by a mob of miners fueled by religious fervor.

His castle, along with the villages of Chocerady, Údolnice, and Vráž, were left to his widow, Anna of Úlibic. His children were left under the guardianship of the knights Mikuláš Šraňek and Mikuláš of Reblic.

In popular culture
Sir Radzig Kobyla, a character featured in the 2018 video game Kingdom Come: Deliverance, is based on Racek.

References

1416 deaths
Medieval Bohemian nobility
15th-century Bohemian people
Date of birth unknown